Phoenixville Area High School is a senior high school located on 1200 Gay St, Phoenixville, Pennsylvania. It is a member of the Phoenixville Area School District and teaches students from grades nine through twelve. As of the 2019-2020 School year there are 1189 members of the student body, and the principal is Dr. Rose Scioli (2021). The school's mascot is the Phantom, who has been the mascot since the 1960s. The Phantoms' colors are purple and white. Their mission statement is, "to prepare, inspire, and graduate students to meet the challenges of the future."

Sports
The Phoenixville Area High School has been a member of the PAC-10 conference for 25 years. The other high schools within this conference are Boyertown, Pottstown, Methacton, Norristown, Pottsgrove, Pope John Paul II, Perkiomen Valley, Upper Perkiomen, Springford, Owen J. Roberts, and Upper Merion. A multitude of sports are offered such as boys and girls soccer, track, tennis, golf, lacrosse, cheerleading and swimming. For girls only sports, there is field hockey and softball and for boys there is football and wrestling. Many of the teams and individuals from Phoenixville have been PAC-10 champions. A select few in recent years, such as Kyriq Williams, Courtney Kedra,  Kyle MacLelland, Tom McAvoy, and Lauren Terstappen, have gone on to be state champions as well. Mike Piazza, Andre Thornton, and Creighton Gubanich were all on major league baseball teams and are also Phoenixville High School alumni.

Senior Project
In order to graduate from any school in Pennsylvania a 'graduation  project' must be completed. For Phoenixville High School this project consists of completing a fifteen-hour community service project as well as writing updates reporting progress along the way. Each project must have a project adviser that the student chooses to sign off that the project was completed. The most common projects are typically coaching sports teams. Once the project is completed a paper must be written outlining the entire project and a five-minute presentation done in meetings at the end of the student's senior year in front of two faculty members.

Music
The Phoenixville Area High School offers a multitude of opportunities when it comes to music. Classes such as choir, symphonic band, and wind ensemble are offered during the school day. Anyone can be in choir or symphonic band but they must go through an audition process to be accepted into the wind ensemble, jazz band, or vocal ensemble. The marching band, jazz band, and vocal ensemble are considered extracurricular activities, having meetings outside of the regular school day.

F.O.C.U.S.
"For Our Children's Uncompromised Safety Post Prom Parent Organization"
Project F.O.C.U.S. is a parent run organization to ensure their children's safety after prom. They do this starting in September every year by meeting and brainstorming a theme for that year's post prom celebration at the Phoenixville Area High School. The program works hard meeting once a month until the month of prom to get activities, food, and shows together to entertain the students. They get donations from local businesses and churches to help cover the expenses. For an example, in the year 2010 the F.O.C.U.S. theme was "An Evening in the Orient". With this theme, the entire inside of the high school was decorated to look like an oriental town complete with lanterns and a sushi bar. There are no students involved in this program, the only information students know is the theme before they enter.

Clubs
There are many clubs offered at the Phoenixville Area High School. Some are nationally run such as Future Business Leaders of America (FBLA), National Honor Society (NHS), Key Club, and Modern Music Masters (Tri-M). There are also student originated clubs such as Green Club, Dungeons and Dragons Club, Art Club, Latin Club, Engineering club, Science Club, Model United Nations Club,  and Varsity Club. Out of all of the clubs listed there are only prerequisites that must be met for admittance to NHS, Tri-M, and Varsity Club. The majority of the clubs at Phoenixville High School are sustained financially by themselves. The most common types of fundraising for clubs are bake sales and dances. If a club needs a substantial amount of money they can request donations from the Phoenixville Community Education Foundation, an organization instated to help cover funding that was cut by the Phoenixville School District.

Phantoms
The school's mascot, The Phantom, came as a result of a 1934 football match between Lower Merion and Phoenixville.  Both teams were very good, although Lower Merion was regarded as the better of the two.  After Phoenixville soundly defeated Lower Merion, a sportswriter for a Philadelphia newspaper wrote that "Phoenixville ran through their (Lower Merion's) lines like a bunch of Phantoms."  This nickname stuck, and eventually became the team's official name.

Notable alumni
 Mike Piazza, former catcher and designated hitter for Major League Baseball.
 André Thornton, former Major League Baseball player.
 Creighton Gubanich, former Major League Baseball player with Boston Red Sox.
 David White (Daniel David White).  Although born in Colorado, the actor who portrayed Larry Tate in the TV series Bewitched was a 1933 graduate of Phoenixville High School.
 Kevin Negandhi, ESPN Anchor.
 Rich Kraynak, linebacker for the Philadelphia Eagles.
 Neal Olkewicz, linebacker for the Washington Redskins.
 Rob Lohr, gridiron football player
 John Stauffer, Pennsylvania State Representative and State Senator
Michael Basca, former player for the Philadelphia Eagles

References

External links

School website

Public high schools in Pennsylvania
Schools in Chester County, Pennsylvania